Hyde High School is a co-educational secondary school located in the Flowery Field area of Hyde in the English county of Greater Manchester.

It is a community school administered by Tameside Metropolitan Borough Council, and offers GCSEs and BTECs as programmes of study for pupils.

The school was previously awarded Technology College status, and was named Hyde Technology School for a time before the new school building opened in 2012 as Hyde Community College. In 2020 the school closed its sixth form provision and was renamed Hyde High School. The school continues to expand, with a high demand for school places in the local area.

References

External links
Hyde High School official website

Secondary schools in Tameside
Community schools in Tameside